The 1922 Utah Utes football team represented the University of Utah as a member of the Rocky Mountain Conference (RMC) during the 1922 college football season. Led by fourth-year head coach Thomas M. Fitzpatrick the Utes compiled an overall record of 7–1 with a mark of 5–0 in conference play, winning the RMC title, the first conference championship in program history.

BYU resumed playing football in 1922; the two teams resumed their series for the first time since playing in 1898 when BYU was called Brigham Young Academy.

Schedule

References

Utah
Utah Utes football seasons
Rocky Mountain Athletic Conference football champion seasons
Utah Utes football